Mary Alexandra Bell Eastlake (née Mary Alexandra Bell) (1864, Douglas, Ontario - 1951, Ottawa) was a Canadian painter most notable for her portraits of women and children, as well as a jewelry designer and producer.

Biography
Born in Douglas, Ontario, Bell grew up in Carillon, Quebec and later in Almonte, Ontario. She received her formal art training from Robert Harris at the Art Association of Montreal from 1884 to 1887 and from William Merritt Chase at the Art Students League in New York. She continued her studies in Paris at the Académie Julian and Académie Colarossi between 1891 and 1892. She first exhibited in the Paris Salon in 1889. She was elected an associate of the Royal Canadian Academy of Arts in 1893. She sought to use contemporary subject matter in her paintings, often interpreting the subject of women and children, and was attentive to light and colour.

After meeting Charles Herbert Eastlake, an English painter and director of the Chelsea Polytechnic and marrying him in 1897, she moved to England and devoted time to learning enamelling and metal work for the production of jewelry as an applied art. She exhibited her work at the Palace of Fine Arts at the 1893 World's Columbian Exposition in Chicago, Illinois. One of her pastels, an effect of sunlight through trees, was exhibited at the Salon of 1906. She painted in Sweden, Holland, and Belgium, as well as England and France. In 1927, she had a major show titled Oils, Water Colors and Pastels by Mrs. C.H. Eastlake at the Art Gallery of Toronto (later its name changed to the Art Gallery of Ontario). After the death of her husband, Eastlake returned to Canada in 1939.

The Pastel and the Boston Water Colour Societies made her a member, and besides the Salon, she exhibited at the Royal Academy, Arts and Crafts, and New English Art Club, and at exhibitions in Canada and the United States. Her works are in the collection of the National Gallery of Canada.

Selected works
Moonrise
The Village on the Cliff
Reverie
Snowy Day in a Canadian Village

References

Bibliography 
 
  
 
 
 

1864 births
1951 deaths
Canadian portrait painters
Canadian women painters
Jewellery designers
Académie Colarossi alumni
Académie Julian alumni
Canadian Impressionist painters
Canadian watercolourists